Aldwych tramway station (separate from Aldwych Underground station) was a tram stop underneath Kingsway, a road in central London, England. It was built in 1906 by the London County Council Tramways as part of the Kingsway tramway subway, joining the separate networks of tramways in North and South London.

Services
Tram services commenced on 24 February 1906, running from Angel through Holborn, the other station in the tram subway, to Aldwych. Through services across London began on 10 April 1908, running from  Highbury station through Holborn and then east to Tower Bridge or south to Kennington Gate.

Following the decision to withdraw tram services in London and replace them with buses, the station closed just after 12.30am on 6 April 1952.

Redevelopment

In 1964, the Strand Underpass, a road tunnel, was opened to alleviate northbound traffic flow from Waterloo Bridge to Kingsway. The underpass took over a section of the tram subway, and rises at its north end through the site of the former Holborn tramway station. No sign of either of the former stations is visible on the surface or from the road tunnel.

External links
Includes an illustrated account of a visit to the site in November 2003
LCC Tramways 1914 Map showing routes south of Aldwych station

Transport architecture in London
Trams in London